Dingana jerinae, or Jerine's widow, is a butterfly of the family Nymphalidae. It is only known from the upper southern scree slopes of the Kransberg in Limpopo, South Africa.

The wingspan is 65–72 mm. Adults are on wing in November. There is one generation per year.

The larvae probably feed on various Poaceae species. Larvae have been reared on Pennisetum clandestinum.

References

Butterflies described in 1996
Satyrini